Conus hanshassi is a species of sea snail, a marine gastropod mollusk in the family Conidae, the cone snails, cone shells or cones.

These snails are predatory and venomous. They are capable of "stinging" humans.

Description
The shell is generally elongated conical to turgid is shape, with an elevated spire and a definite shoulder. The shell has a white ground color and is marked with medium brown splotches and irregular rows of dots or dashes. The holotype is 23.3mm in length.

Distribution
This marine species occurs off Siargao Island, Philippines, collected at 20m

References

 Puillandre N., Duda T.F., Meyer C., Olivera B.M. & Bouchet P. (2015). One, four or 100 genera? A new classification of the cone snails. Journal of Molluscan Studies. 81: 1-23

External links
  To World Register of Marine Species
 
  The Cone Collector website R. Michael Filmer on line treatise, a write up on the species can be found under "HI" and page 6.

hanshassi

Gastropods described in 2012
Molluscs of the Philippines